The Ultimate Tour was a reunion tour in 2006 by British pop group, Take That. The tour, featuring four of the original members of the group: Gary Barlow, Howard Donald, Jason Orange and Mark Owen, ran for a total of 33 shows in Britain and Ireland. Sugababes were the supporting act for that year. Each member of the band received £1,500,000 from the tour after tax.

History
The Ultimate Tour was the first time that Take That had performed together since they split in 1996. The show featured all the original members of the group, except Robbie Williams who quit the group in 1995. At a press conference in London on 25 November 2005 the group front man Gary Barlow announced: "Thanks for giving us the last 10 years off but unfortunately the rumours are true. Take That are going back on tour." The news came after renewed interest in the group following a televised documentary proved to be a ratings success and their album Never Forget – The Ultimate Collection peaked at #2 in the UK Albums Chart. The tour was originally scheduled to be an 11 date arena tour but after they sold out within 30 minutes of going on sale, more dates were immediately added as promoters doubled the number of shows. The group sold 275,000 tickets in the space of under 3 hours, ironically making it the second fastest tour of 2005 behind former member Robbie Williams' solo tour. Such was the level of interest in the tour, promoters were forced to add further dates to the tour, this time in Stadium venues. Dates at the new Wembley Stadium, Etihad Stadium in Manchester and the Millennium Stadium in Cardiff were all announced. When Wembley Stadium sold out in just 30 minutes, further more dates at Wembley and Manchester were announced. In March 2006, the dates at Wembley Stadium were rescheduled to the National Bowl in Milton Keynes due to the delay in the construction of Wembley Stadium.

Supporting acts
The main support act for The Ultimate Tour was British soul singer, Beverley Knight. Knight was originally scheduled to perform only on the arena dates of the tour, but proved so popular with audiences that she was invited to play the stadium shows as well. As well as playing her own set, Knight provided backing vocals for Take That during "Once You've Tasted Love" and gave a spoken introduction to "Relight My Fire", as well as singing Lulu's vocals from the same song at the arena shows. At the stadium dates, Lulu performed her own vocals for "Relight My Fire" and Knight only performed the introduction. Knight also appeared during the finale song, "Never Forget". The other support act for the five British stadium dates at the end of the tour was British girl group Sugababes, and the singer Lulu made a guest appearance during Take That's show to sing her part on "Relight My Fire". The Pussycat Dolls supported the band upon their return to Ireland and the last date of the tour.

Setlist
 Band Manufactured Opening - "O Verona"
 "Once You've Tasted Love" (featuring Beverley Knight)
 "Pray"
 "Today I've Lost You"
 "Why Can't I Wake Up with You"
 "It Only Takes a Minute" (tango version)
 "Babe"
 "Everything Changes"
 "A Million Love Songs"
 "The Beatles" Medley ("I Want to Hold Your Hand"/"A Hard Day's Night"/"She Loves You"/"I Feel Fine"/"Get Back"/"Hey Jude")
 "How Deep is Your Love?"
 "Love Ain't Here Anymore"
 "Apache 2006" (contains elements of "These Are The Days Of Our Lives")
 "Sure"
 "Relight My Fire" (featuring Beverley Knight & Lulu)
 "Let It Rain"
 "Back For Good"
 "Could It Be Magic" (with Robbie Williams video intro)
 "Never Forget"

Tour dates

Box office score data

Band
Musical director, keyboards, guitar, sax: Mike Stevens
Guitar: Milton McDonald
Bass guitar: Lee Pomeroy
Drums: Donavan Hepburn
Percussion: Karlos Edwards 
Keyboards: Jamie Norton, Bernie Smith

DVD release
The concerts on 17 and 18 June at the Etihad Stadium in Manchester were recorded for a subsequent DVD HD DVD and Blu-ray releases, special limited-edition package also contains a live CD with five songs from the show. An edited version of the show was broadcast on British channel ITV2 during Christmas time that year.

Critical response
The tour garnered generally favourable reviews. In his review of the Manchester leg, Chris Long of the BBC wrote that the tour was the "biggest thing to hit Manchester in recent years" and called it "a flawless performance".

References

2006 concert tours
Take That concert tours